Nepalese Canadians or Nepali Canadians are Canadians with roots in Nepal.

Migration history
Nepalese are recent immigrants in Canada and their numbers are relatively small. According to the 1991 report on immigration and citizenship, only 125 people indicated Nepal as their country of birth. Aside from immigrants from Nepal itself, there are also Nepali-speaking people from neighboring countries such as India, Burma and Bhutan as well as Nepalese who lived in other countries (Fiji, Hong Kong, the United Kingdom and the United States) before immigrating to Canada.

The majority of Nepalese in Canada migrated in pursuit of better economic opportunities and professional fulfillment. Some who had experienced discrimination in the countries they left were also attracted by the possibility of enjoying political and religious freedom in Canada. A small number of Nepalis arrived during the 1960s and early 1970s. From the late 1970s to the present there has been a relative increase in their number. Some Nepalis arrived in Canada as independent professionals and members of various occupational groups, while others were able to enter through family affiliations and personal contacts. A small group of Nepalis came through the Gurkha Welfare Appeal (Canada), which was established by Canadian military veterans after World War II.

Nepalese have settled primarily in the urban areas of Canada. Almost half of them are located in Ontario, and the second-largest settlement is in British Columbia. In 2013 and 2014, more than two thousand Nepalese settled in Alberta. Only a handful are spread throughout the rest of Canada. Immigration overview of permanent residents in Canada (Canada Government) has published that between 2004 and 2013, 8218 people with Nepal as source country became permanent residents of Canada. There are also a number of Canadian parents seeking to adopt children from Nepal, although recently Canadian authorities have suspended adoptions from Nepal. The Canadian government has opened a permanent residency program for professionals like doctors, engineers, nurse, professors, and accountants from Nepal. Nepali foreign employment agencies have promoted Nepal's workforce and seek openings in Canada so Nepalese workers can be hired through personal contacts in various sectors.

Current status
The Nepalis who have immigrated to Canada are largely a well-educated group, and some have advanced university degrees. Members of the Nepalese community in Canada occupy positions as professors, bankers, foresters, accountants, doctors, engineers, architects, computer professionals, agriculturalists, and researchers.  Some have private practices in medicine, pharmacy, and accounting, or are self-employed in various fields such as real estate and the hospitality and service sectors. While there are Nepalese Canadians working in restaurants and factories, others have high-level positions as senior executives in corporations and partners in national firms. Nepali immigrants are also beginning to establish small businesses, such as restaurants, specialty stores and quick-marts.

Many Nepalese Canadians participate in mainstream-Canadian political, professional, religious, and charitable organizations. Because of their small numbers, however, their influence on Canadian regional and national politics is as yet only marginal.

Notable people

 Sudarshan Gautam, Nepali diaspora member; the first armless person to summit Mount Everest without the use of prosthetic
 Aditya Jha, involved in Canadian philanthropy and active giving, business success, political involvement
 Bhutila Karpoche, Ontario Member of Provincial Parliament for Parkdale—High Park (2018–present)
 Manjushree Thapa, Popular Nepali writer
 Curtis Waters, born Abhinav Bastakoti, popular singer
 Naresh Budhayer, former Nepal national team player & current player of Ontario.

References

External links
Canadian Reporters

 
 
Asian Canadian
Canadian
Canada
South Asian Canadian